The following lists events that happened during 1948 in the Grand Duchy of Luxembourg.

Incumbents

Events

January – March
 9 January – The Luxembourg Airlines Company is founded.
 29 January – The first conference of Benelux foreign ministers is held, in Luxembourg City.
 2 February – Luxembourg Airlines Company makes its first flight, from Luxembourg – Findel to Paris – Le Bourget.
 17 March – Luxembourg signs the Treaty of Brussels.

April – June
 3 April – The Obermosel-Zeitung and l'Unio'n cease publication and are merged into the new Lëtzebuerger Journal.
 5 April – The Lëtzebuerger Journal begins publication.
 6 June – Partial elections are held to the Chamber of Deputies, resulting in gains for the Luxembourg Socialist Workers' Party at the expense of the Christian Social People's Party

July – September
 14 July – In the aftermath of the previous month's election, the government is reshuffled, with Nicolas Margue and Lambert Schaus replaced by Pierre Frieden and Aloyse Hentgen.
 26 July – At the 1948 Summer Olympics, the Luxembourg national football team records its largest-ever victory, beating Afghanistan 6–0.
 29 July – The 1948 Summer Olympics proper begin, with 45 competitors from Luxembourg.  None wins a medal.
 4 August – Émile Raus, Lambert Schaus, and André Origer are appointed to the Council of State, replacing Michel Rasquin and Pierre Frieden.

October – December

Births
 30 January – Aly Jaerling, politician
 7 May – Marc Agosta, athlete
 19 November – Robert Biever, member of the Council of State

Deaths
 8 November – Jean-Pierre Muller, cyclist

Footnotes

References